The Charles H. Lundquist College of Business (also known as the Lundquist College of Business) is the University of Oregon's business school. Founded in 1914, the Lundquist College offers undergraduate degree programs in business administration and accounting, as well as MBA, Executive MBA, Master of Science in Sports Product Management, Master of Accounting, Master of Science in Finance, and PhD graduate programs. These degree programs are supported by four departments (finance, management, marketing, and operations and business analytics) and one school of accounting.

About
The Lundquist College of Business draws strength from its links to the Pacific Rim and the distinctive qualities of Oregon culture: innovation, sustainability, active lifestyles, and financial stewardship.

The college is accredited through the Association to Advance Collegiate Schools of Business (AACSB). Roughly 5% of the world's business schools have this accreditation. Additionally, the accounting program is also accredited though AACSB.

The college is housed in the Lillis Business Complex. Completed in 2003, the facility's then state-of-the-art lighting system was once featured in a Wall Street Journal article. The college's current dean is Bruce Blonigen. Blonigen joined the Lundquist College as dean on July 15, 2022.

The college is home to four centers of excellence (Center for Sustainable Business Practices, James H. Warsaw Sports Marketing Center, Lundquist Center for Entrepreneurship, and Cameron Center for Finance and Securities Analysis) that advance an "experiential learning" approach to business education. The Warsaw Sports Marketing Center was the first program of its kind housed within a U.S. college of business. Founded in 1993, the Warsaw Sports Marketing Center provides a platform for both research and education focused on the $500 billion sports business industry. The most recent Sports Business global rankings of sports master's programs published in September 2021, placed the Oregon MBA's sports business track (coordinated by the Warsaw Center) among the top seven programs in the world.

Each year, the college's Lundquist Center for Entrepreneurship presents the New Venture Championship, an investment competition for graduate students that draws competitors from all over the world.

The Department of Accounting offers a one-year Masters of Accounting (MAcc) program allowing accounting students to earn enough credits for CPA eligibility in the State of Oregon. In addition, the Beta Alpha Psi Chapter is the second oldest in the nation.

Portland campus
The Lundquist College of Business operates its Oregon Executive MBA program in Portland, Oregon. The program for working professionals, located at the Oregon Business Institute in downtown Portland was formerly a partnership of Oregon State University, Portland State University, and the University of Oregon and is now solely a program of the Lundquist_College_of_Business. In the 2016, the Oregon Executive MBA Program and Master of Science in Sports Management program relocated to a new building across the street from the White Stag Block, where the rest of UO's Portland programs are based.

Programs

Undergraduate programs
The undergraduate program offers BA/BS degrees in business administration and accounting. 

According to the 2022 U.S. News & World Report rankings of undergraduate business programs, the college is ranked 41st nationally.

Business Administration
The undergraduate business program has been accredited by the AACSB since 1923.

Before students can declare their major as either Business or Accounting they must declare their major as "Pre-Business". As Pre-Business students, students complete their "lower division core" and supporting coursework. Students must take four business courses, 75 credits, and maintain a 3.0 GPA before they can major in either Business or Accounting. 

According to USNews, the undergraduate program is ranked 41st out of 514 programs nationwide in 2021. Among public universities it is ranked 26th.

The undergraduate program is primarily a two-year program. Over one thousand students are enrolled as Pre-Business majors in the College. However, not all Pre-Business majors become Business or Accounting majors.

Accounting
The undergraduate accounting program is based in the School of Accounting and it has been accredited by the AACSB since 1989.

Minor program

There are also 900+ students enrolled in minors programs at the College. Students may earn a minor in business administration, sports business, entrepreneurship, or sustainable business.

Graduate programs
Graduate programs have been accredited by the AACSB since 1962.

Oregon MBA
The Oregon MBA is available as a full-time, two-year program; one-year accelerated program; or a part-time flexible program. Students complete a set of core business courses and then complete additional course work in one of five specialization areas: Advanced Strategy and Leadership, Finance and Securities Analysis, Innovation and Entrepreneurship, Sports Business, Sustainable Business Practices.

The Oregon MBA was ranked 72nd in the United States by the publication U.S. News & World Report in its "2023 Best Business Schools" ranking.

In 2015, the Princeton Review named the Oregon MBA program first in the United States in the Green MBA category. In 2022, the Oregon MBA program was ranked fourth in the Green MBA category by the same publication. 

The MBA program was once hailed as the 9th best "Green MBA" in the world by the magazine Corporate Knights.

Oregon Executive MBA

Founded in 1986, the Oregon Executive MBA is a twenty-month program tailored for individuals who already have several years of work and management experience.  Classes meet on alternating Fridays and Saturdays with short breaks in December and March, and summers off. The Oregon Executive MBA follows a cohort model, promoting camaraderie and the development of a professional network, and with students progressing through the program together.  The curriculum includes an international study trip during the first year to developing countries such as Brazil, China, Argentina, Peru, Hong Kong, and Vietnam.  The second year culminates in the Capstone Business Project, where students work with the guidance of advisers to create a business plan or consulting project.

Sports Product Management
There are two methods of obtaining the Sports Product Management Master's degree. The full-time Master's is in person and takes 18 months. It consists of 5 terms and 65 credit hours, beginning in the fall term. It takes place in Portland, Oregon. The second method is online. The duration is 24 months, and consists of 8 terms with 65 credit hours. It is designed for working professionals and it begins in the spring term.

Master of Accounting
The MAcc curriculum is designed to be completed in one academic year. It consists of twelve three- or four-credit courses and two one-credit seminars (45 credits minimum). Five core accounting classes, two accounting electives, five general business or other graduate electives, and two one-credit seminars in Developing the Business Professional are required.

MS in Finance
Students complete the Master's in Science of Finance (MSF) program in 12 months(4 quarters) beginning in the summer term. The curriculum emphasizes valuation and asset management and consists of six core courses plus electives, totaling a minimum of 45 credits. The required courses have no pre-requisites for MSF students.

PhD

Organization and research

The college is organized into 4 departments, one school, and 4 cross-disciplinary centers.

School of Accounting
The School of Accounting was established in 2017. The accounting program was formerly a department.

Departments
 Finance
 Management
 Marketing
 Operations and Business Analytics

Centers

 Cameron Center for Finance and Securities Analysis
 Center for Sustainable Business Practices
 Lundquist Center for Entrepreneurship
 Warsaw Sports Marketing Center

According to rankings compiled by the University of Texas at Dallas, LCB ranks 59th in North America in contributions to research.

According to rankings compiled by Brigham Young University, LCB ranks 1st in tax research.

Relationship with the sports industry
The college has a longstanding relationship with the sports industry, more specifically sports marketing. The college's Warsaw Sports Marketing Center is recognized as a leading authority in sports marketing. The center was founded in 1994 with an endowment established by Jim Warsaw. Furthermore, the center is said to be the first sports marketing center to be housed within an American business school. The center is a multi-disciplinary research hub. It also provides experiential learning opportunities for UO students. In 2012, the center was quoted in 571 media outlets globally.

The Sports Product Management program, based in Portland, is one of the first of its kind.

Notable alumni

Below is a list of notable Lundquist College of Business alumni with significant ties to the business world. See the linked article above for a more extensive list of alumni.
 Bill Bowerman, (circa 1970), co-founder of Nike Inc.; former Oregon Ducks track and field coach
 Paul Brainerd, founder of Aldus Corporation and creator of Pagemaker
 Renée James, M.B.A. (1992), former president of Intel Corporation
 Phil Knight, B.S. (1959), co-founder and former CEO of Nike Inc.; currently 35th wealthiest billionaire in the world
 Chuck Lillis, Ph.D. (1972), former chairman and CEO of MediaOne; namesake of the Lillis Business Complex; current chairman of the Board of Trustees of the University of Oregon
 Mickey Loomis, B.S. (1979), general manager of the New Orleans Saints; executive vice president of the New Orleans Pelicans
 Robert Polet, M.B.A. (1976), former CEO of Gucci
 Jamie Price, President and CEO of Advisor Group
 Joseph Robertson, Executive M.B.A. (1997), former president of Oregon Health and Science University

See also
New Venture Championship

References

External links
Charles H. Lundquist College of Business (Official website)

University of Oregon
1884 establishments in Oregon
Business schools in Oregon
Educational institutions established in 1884